Kishwar Ahmed (born 15 November 1976) is a Pakistani politician who was a Member of the Provincial Assembly of Balochistan, from May 2013 to May 2018.

Early life
Ahmed was born on 15 November 1976 in Quetta, Balochistan, Pakistan.

Political career

She was elected to the Provincial Assembly of Balochistan as a candidate of Pakistan Muslim League (N) on a reserved seat for women in 2013 Pakistani general election.

References

Living people
Pakistan Muslim League (N) politicians
Balochistan MPAs 2013–2018
1976 births